Douglas Road station is a station on the Metrorail rapid transit system just southwest of Coconut Grove, in Miami, Florida.  It is the southernmost Metrorail station in Miami city limits, although it has a Coral Gables address. The station is located at the intersection of Douglas Road (West 37th Avenue) and South Dixie Highway (US 1), three blocks south Bird Road (SW 40th Street). It opened to service May 20, 1984.


Station layout
The station has two tracks served by an island platform, with a parking lot northwest of the platform.

References

External links

 MDT – Metrorail Stations
 Station from Google Maps Street View

Green Line (Metrorail)
Orange Line (Metrorail)
Metrorail (Miami-Dade County) stations in Miami
Railway stations in the United States opened in 1984
1984 establishments in Florida